This is the list of songs performed by Anuradha Paudwal from 1973 til date. Of the 1501 songs that have been performed by Paudwal, 785 are listed here. She has also sung in several other languages.

Marathi songs

Bengali songs

Bengali Non-film songs

Hindi songs

1970s

1973

1976

1977

1978

1979

1980s

1980

1981

1982

1983

1984

1985

1986

1987

1988

1989

1990s

1990

1991

1992

1993

1994

1995

1996

1997

1998

1999

2000s

2000

2001

2002

2003

2004

2005

2006–present

Hindi Non-film songs

Songs for television

Kannada songs

Film songs

Private songs

Tamil songs

Telugu songs

Oriya songs

Film songs

Non-film songs

Nepali songs

Film songs

Assamese songs

Non-film songs

Bhojpuri songs

Non-film songs

Gujarati songs

Non-film songs

Manipuri songs

References

External links
 

Paudwal, Anuradha